Justin Moore (born April 12, 2000) is an American college basketball player for the Villanova Wildcats of the Big East Conference.

High school career
Moore attended DeMatha Catholic High School in Hyattsville, Maryland. He suffered a season-ending torn ACL as a sophomore. In his junior season, Moore averaged 16.6 points per game. As a senior, he averaged 18.2 points, 7.1 rebounds and 4.1 assists per game, leading his team to its second straight Maryland Private School Tournament state title. Moore was named Maryland Gatorade Player of the Year and Washington Catholic Athletic Conference Co-Player of the Year. He competed for Team Takeover on the Amateur Athletic Union circuit. Moore was invited to play in the 2019 Nike Hoop Summit. A four-star recruit, he committed to playing college basketball for Villanova over offers from Maryland, Louisville and Wake Forest, among others.

College career
On December 1, 2019, Moore recorded a freshman season-high 25 points and five steals for Villanova in an 83–72 win over La Salle. On February 26, 2020, he posted 21 points including five three-pointers in a 71–60 win against St. John's. As a freshman, he averaged 11.3 points, 3.1 rebounds and 1.9 assists per game, leading all Big East freshman in regular season scoring. Moore was a five-time Big East Freshman of the Week selection. He was unanimously named to the Big East All-Freshman Team.

Coming into his sophomore season, Moore was named to the preseason Jerry West Award watchlist as well as Preseason Second Team All-Big East. As a sophomore, Moore averaged 12.9 points and 4.1 rebounds per game, helping Villanova reach the Sweet 16. In his junior season debut, he scored a career-high 27 points including six three-pointers in a 91–51 win over Mount St. Mary's. On February 3, 2022, Moore surpassed the 1,000 point mark in a 83–73 loss to Marquette. He was named to the Second Team All-Big East.

Career statistics

College

|-
| style="text-align:left;"| 2019–20
| style="text-align:left;"| Villanova
| 31 || 17 || 29.9 || .418 || .396 || .714 || 3.1 || 1.9 || .7 || .3 || 11.3
|-
| style="text-align:left;"| 2020–21
| style="text-align:left;"| Villanova
| 25 || 24 || 32.8 || .441 || .310 || .778 || 4.1 || 3.0 || .6 || .4 || 12.9
|-
| style="text-align:left;"| 2021–22
| style="text-align:left;"| Villanova
| 36 || 36 || 34.6 || .397 || .356 || .750 || 4.8 || 2.3 || 1.0 || .4 || 14.8
|- class="sortbottom"
| style="text-align:center;" colspan="2"|Career
| 92 || 77 || 32.5 || .415 || .356 || .748 || 4.0 || 2.3 || .8 || .3 || 13.1

References

External links
Villanova Wildcats bio
USA Basketball bio

Living people
2000 births
American men's basketball players
Basketball players from Maryland
DeMatha Catholic High School alumni
People from Fort Washington, Maryland
Shooting guards
Villanova Wildcats men's basketball players